Point of Bay is a town in the Canadian province of Newfoundland and Labrador. The town had a population of 154 people in 2016, down from 163 in the Canada 2006 Census.

Demographics 

See also
 List of cities and towns in Newfoundland and Labrador

References

Towns in Newfoundland and Labrador